The Pacific Forest Reserve was established by the General Land Office in Washington on February 20, 1893 with . On February 22, 1898 the forest was combined with other lands to create the Mount Rainier Forest Reserve, and the name was discontinued.

References

External links
Forest History Society
Listing of the National Forests of the United States and Their Dates (from Forest History Society website) Text from Davis, Richard C., ed. Encyclopedia of American Forest and Conservation History. New York: Macmillan Publishing Company for the Forest History Society, 1983. Vol. II, pp. 743-788.

Former National Forests of Washington (state)
Defunct forest reserves of the United States